Frederick K. Ostendorf (August 5, 1892 – March 2, 1965) was an American professional baseball player who played in one game for the Indianapolis Hoosiers of the Federal League during the  season.

He was born in Baltimore, Maryland and died in Kecoughtan, Virginia at the age of 72.

External links

Major League Baseball pitchers
Baseball players from Baltimore
Indianapolis Hoosiers players
1892 births
1965 deaths
Henderson Hens players
Harrisburg Coal Miners players
Marshalltown Ansons players
Thomasville Hornets players
Griffin Lightfoots players
Newport News Shipbuilders players